The 2004 Siemens 300 was the 19th stock car race of the 2004 NASCAR Nextel Cup Series season and the 12th iteration of the event. The race was held on Sunday, July 25, 2004, before a crowd of 99,000 in Loudon, New Hampshire, at New Hampshire International Raceway, a 1.058 miles (1.703 km) permanent, oval-shaped, low-banked racetrack. The race took the scheduled 300 laps to complete. At race's end, Kurt Busch of Roush Racing would hold off the field on the final restart, defeating a dominant Ryan Newman with three to go to take his 10th career NASCAR Nextel Cup Series win and his second of the season. To fill out the podium, Jeff Gordon of Hendrick Motorsports and Ryan Newman of Penske-Jasper Racing would finish second and third, respectively.

Background 

New Hampshire International Speedway is a 1.058-mile (1.703 km) oval speedway located in Loudon, New Hampshire which has hosted NASCAR racing annually since the early 1990s, as well as an IndyCar weekend and the oldest motorcycle race in North America, the Loudon Classic. Nicknamed "The Magic Mile", the speedway is often converted into a 1.6-mile (2.6 km) road course, which includes much of the oval. The track was originally the site of Bryar Motorsports Park before being purchased and redeveloped by Bob Bahre. The track is currently one of eight major NASCAR tracks owned and operated by Speedway Motorsports.

Entry list 

*Withdrew due to not fitting inspection templates numerous times.

**While he had started the race, he would have to be relieved by Martin Truex Jr. for practice sessions and qualifying, as Earnhardt Jr. was recovering from burns suffered from a sports car race. However, as Earnhardt Jr. did start the race, he was credited with the finish.

Practice

First practice 
The first practice session would occur on Friday, July 23, at 11:20 AM EST and would last for two hours.

Second practice 
The second practice session would occur on Saturday, July 24, at 9:30 AM EST and would last for 45 minutes.

Third and final practice 
The third and final practice session, sometimes referred to as Happy Hour, would occur on Saturday, July 24, at 11:10 AM EST and would last for 45 minutes.

Qualifying 
Qualifying would occur on Friday, July 23, at 3:05 PM EST. Each driver would have two laps to set a fastest time; the fastest of the two would count as their official qualifying lap. Positions 1-38 would be decided on time, while positions 39-43 would be based on provisionals. Four spots are awarded by the use of provisionals based on owner's points. The fifth is awarded to a past champion who has not otherwise qualified for the race. If no past champ needs the provisional, the next team in the owner points will be awarded a provisional.

Kyle Busch, driving a part-time schedule for Hendrick Motorsports, would crash in turn 4 on his warm-up lap. Since the No. 84 did not have enough owner's points for a provision, Busch would miss the race.

Two drivers would fail to qualify: Kevin Lepage and Kyle Busch. In addition, Ryan McGlynn, who had taken part in some of the weekend's practice sessions, also withdrew due to unknown reasons.

Full qualifying results

Race results

References 

2004 NASCAR Nextel Cup Series
NASCAR races at New Hampshire Motor Speedway
July 2004 sports events in the United States
2004 in sports in New Hampshire